Near Ruin were a four piece metalcore band from Maidstone, United Kingdom. They were one of the important acts in the Medway scene. Near Ruin often included political motives in their song lyrics. Near Ruin were known for the strobe lights and mosh pits during their performances.

In August 2014, they released debut album No End to positive reviews. Eighteen months later in February 2016, the band released their latest single "Praying For Nothing", with an accompanying music video.

In June 2016 the band announced on their Facebook page that they had disbanded, citing future projects coming from some of the members in the near future.

History

Throne of Blood/The Fracture (2004–2006) 
Marcus Kidner and Luke Knight attended Cornwallis Academy as children, where they met and despite having no musical ability, knowledge or experience, decided they wanted to form a band. Marcus and Luke spent time together learning guitar from scratch, and once they could manage a few simple chords, decided to start a band named Throne of Blood. The band featured the two on guitar, and soon after the addition of friend Simon Beck on vocals and keys. The three composed some ideas whilst actively searching for a bassist and drummer with little luck. Struggling with their search for additional members, Simon decided to take up guitar alongside his keys and Luke made the switch to bass guitar, a move that meant the band would only need one additional band member in the form of a drummer. Having auditioned for a few drummers with no luck, the band changed their name to The Fracture and began writing some new material.

Name change to Near Ruin, early shows and unreleased demo (2007–2009) 
During 2007 the band again rebranded with a new name Near Ruin believing that the name represented more the themes of their lyrics and song motives. The band carried over some previously written songs modifying them slightly or re-writing sections, and began working on new material as well. Mid 2007 the members met Martin Turner who was soon recruited on drums, and the band began to play local shows at venues such as the United Reform Church. After a string of local shows the band began working on an unnamed demo CD, however the writing and recording process came to a stop when Martin left the band in 2008. Months later the band recruited Jack "Rufus" Sibley to fill the drumming duties. The new line up played more shows before deciding in 2009 to focus again on recording a demo, during this process the band members came to a mutual decision and Jack left the band.

Rebirth (2010–2011) 
In early 2010, the band uploaded their entire Rebirth EP to YouTube, quickly amassing thousands of views on the video streaming site. During this time the band first recruited Lewis Archer, who left the band shortly after the release of the EP. The band subsequently recruited Tim Morgan as their new drummer and started performing live in various venues around Kent.

Rebirth has gained a cult following in the Kent music scene, and is known for being a self-produced record. The tracks "Dying Unborn" and "Voice of Reason" remained in the band's live set to the end of their run due to their status as fan favorite tracks.

As of March 2016, the song "Dying Unborn" has amassed nearly 10,000 views on YouTube, despite the lack of promotion of the track by the band.

No End (2011–2015) 
Near Ruin started performing early versions of songs that would eventually appear on their first album No End from 2011, most notably "Relinquish". The band was less active during 2012 and most of 2013, but the end of 2013 saw Near Ruin release first single "Smoke and Mirrors" on YouTube. The track is notable for its shift in the band's sound towards a focus on lead synth parts, it also put more focus on clean vocals by lead vocalist Marcus Kidner. This would mark the official beginning of the "No End era", the first record featuring contributions from drummer Tim Morgan, and an overall shift in their sound.

The band released No End on 22 August 2014 at an album launch show at Rock Avenue in Gillingham. The album overall received positive reviews, which helped the four-piece to grow as a band and branch out into other areas of the country, such as Manchester, Surrey and Essex. No End was released via iTunes, Bandcamp and Spotify, as well as physical copies being readily available. During 2015, the band played a large number of shows with stand-in drummer Lewis Archer, who spent a short period of time in the band during the Rebirth era. It was announced by the band on their Facebook page in July 2015 that Tim Morgan had left the band, and that Lewis Archer was the permanent replacement, joining the band for a second time.

"Praying For Nothing" and disbanding (2015–2016) 
In late 2015, the band traveled to Manchester to record a new music video. With hype created from the band's Facebook page, the video for "Praying For Nothing" was released on 11 February 2016, with an accompanying release on various digital stores. "Praying For Nothing" received a positive review from Bournemouth-based writer Jacob Granger, with the general consensus being that the band's sound has matured and the genre of metalcore being redefined in this song. Most notably, the song features a classic rock style guitar solo sandwiched in between two piano parts to close out the track.

In June 2016, Near Ruin announced that they were disbanding via an update on their Facebook page, meaning their single "Praying For Nothing" would be their final work. In the same announcement, vocalist and guitarist Marcus Kidner introduced a new project called The Ethereal And I; a project which would see moderate success but ultimately was disbanded a few years later.

Discography

Singles and EPs

Albums

Music videos

Members

Recent
Prior to their disbanding in June 2016, the line-up of Near Ruin consisted of Marcus Kidner on lead vocals and guitar, Simon Beck on keys and guitars, Luke Knight on bass guitar, and Lewis Archer on drums. Tim Morgan, the band's longest serving drummer, performed drum duties until his departure in 2015.

Past
Marcus Kidner – lead vocals, guitar (2005–2016) 
Simon Beck – keys, guitar, vocals (2005–2016) 
Luke Knight – bass guitar, vocals (2005–2016) 
Lewis Archer – drums, vocals (2009–2010, 2015–2016)
Tim Morgan – drums (2010–2015)
Jack "Rufus" Sibley – drums (2008–2009) 
Martin Turner – drums (2007–2008)

References

Musical groups from Kent
2005 establishments in England
2009 disestablishments in England
Musical groups reestablished in 2010
Musical groups established in 2005
Musical groups disestablished in 2009